Otto Steffers (born October 19, 1972, in Louisville, Kentucky) is a former field hockey defender from the United States, who finished twelfth with the national team at the 1996 Summer Olympics in Atlanta, Georgia.

References
USA Field Hockey

External links
 

1972 births
Living people
American male field hockey players
Field hockey players at the 1996 Summer Olympics
Olympic field hockey players of the United States
Sportspeople from Louisville, Kentucky
Pan American Games bronze medalists for the United States
Pan American Games medalists in field hockey
Field hockey players at the 1995 Pan American Games
Medalists at the 1995 Pan American Games